Cristoforo Majorana (flourished c. 1480–94) was an Italian limner and painter. He was born in Naples, Italy. Majorana trained under Cola Rapicano. He produced work for Ferdinand of Aragon, Giovanni d'Aragona and Andrea Matteo Acquaviva. His work is held in the collections of the Walters Art Museum, National Library of France and the Fitzwilliam Museum.

Notable works

St. Augustine, Commentary on the Psalms, 1480
Aesop, Fables, 1481
Virgil, Aeneid, Eclogues, and Georgics, 1482-94
Ptolemy, Geography

Gallery

References

External links
 Short biography and bibliography, by the Vatican Library

Manuscript illuminators
15th-century Italian painters
Italian male painters
Painters from Naples